The Mysterious Family (also known as The Mysteries Family) is a 2017 Chinese suspense film written and directed by Park Yu-hwan. The film was inspired by a homicide case that occurred in Fujian, in 2014. The film stars Ariel Lin, Jiang Wu, Kara Hui, Chen Xiao and Lan Cheng-lung.

Premise
The Mysterious Family revolves around Miao Miao, a young woman whose life and mental state changes after surviving a brutal attack by a stranger. While trying to come to terms with her trauma, she has a presentiment of a tragic event, and has to race against time in an attempt to find the truth and change the course of events.

Cast
Ariel Lin as Miao Miao
Jiang Wu as Father
Kara Hui as Mother
Chen Xiao as Shu Shu
Lan Cheng-lung as The stranger
An Hu as Police officer
Chang Hsiu-yun as Granny
Jackson Lou as Police officer
Kuo Yao-ren as Police officer
Wang Dao-nan as Doctor
Ma Guo-bi as Lawyer
Mathilde Lin as Student
Chen Wan-hao as Taxi driver

Reception
The Straits Times's Boon Chan, in an article about subtitling in film, highlighted an "emotionally charged" scene in the film that caught his attention. When the mother was confronting her daughter's rapist, the English subtitles went, "You have the nuts to do it, why not have the balls to admit it?" when it should have been translated as "You had the guts to do it, why don't you have the guts to admit it?" He also remarked that "Mixing nuts and balls is clearly a case of a subtitler gone rogue."

References

External links
 
 
 
 

2017 films
Chinese suspense films
Chinese crime films
Chinese drama films
2010s crime films
Films about rape
Films about nightmares
2017 drama films
2010s Mandarin-language films